Research in African Literatures is a triannual peer-reviewed academic journal covering African literary studies. It was established in 1970 and is published by Indiana University Press. The editor-in-chief is Kwaku Larbi Korang (Ohio State University).

Abstracting and indexing
The journal is abstracted and indexed in:
Arts & Humanities Citation Index
Current Contents/Arts & Humanities
EBSCO databases
ProQuest databases

References

External links

Literary magazines published in the United States
African studies journals
Publications established in 1970
Indiana University Press academic journals